The Goldreich–Goldwasser–Halevi (GGH) lattice-based cryptosystem is an asymmetric cryptosystem based on lattices.  There is also a GGH signature scheme.

The Goldreich–Goldwasser–Halevi (GGH) cryptosystem makes use of the fact that the closest vector problem can be a hard problem. This system was published in 1997 by  Oded Goldreich, Shafi Goldwasser, and Shai Halevi, and uses a trapdoor one-way function which relies on the difficulty of lattice reduction. The idea included in this trapdoor function is that, given any basis for a lattice, it is easy to generate a vector which is close to a lattice point, for example taking a lattice point and adding a small error vector. But to return from this erroneous vector to the original lattice point a special basis is needed.

Nguyen and Oded Regev had cryptanalyzed the related GGH signature scheme in 2006.

Operation 
GGH involves a private key and a public key.

The private key is a basis  of a lattice  with good properties (such as short nearly orthogonal vectors) and a unimodular matrix .

The public key is another basis of the lattice  of the form .

For some chosen M, the message space consists of the vector  in the range .

Encryption 
Given a message , error , and a
public key  compute

 

In matrix notation this is

 .

The ciphertext is then

Decryption 
To decrypt the ciphertext one computes

 

The Babai rounding technique will be used to remove the term  as long as it is small enough. Finally compute

 

to get the messagetext.

Example
Let  be a lattice with the basis  and its inverse 

  and 

With

  and
 

this gives

 

Let the message be  and the error vector . Then the ciphertext is

 

To decrypt one must compute

 

Security of the scheme 
In 1999, Nguyen   showed that the GGH encryption scheme has a flaw in the design. He showed that every ciphertext reveals information about the plaintext and that the problem of decryption could be turned into a special closest vector problem much easier to solve than the general CVP.

References

Bibliography 

 Preliminary version in EUROCRYPT 2006.

Lattice-based cryptography
Public-key encryption schemes